Ablukast (INN) is a leukotriene antagonist which has applications in the treatment of inflammatory skin conditions.

References 

Leukotriene antagonists
Chromanes
Piceol ethers
Phenols
Resorcinol ethers
Cyclic ethers